Dünwald is a former municipality in the Unstrut-Hainich-Kreis district of Thuringia, Germany. It was created in January 1994 by the merger of the former municipalities Zaunröden, Beberstedt and Hüpstedt. On 1 January 2023 it was disbanded, and its constituent communities were distributed over 2 other municipalities:
Beberstedt and Hüpstedt to Dingelstädt
Zaunröden to Unstruttal

References

Unstrut-Hainich-Kreis
Former municipalities in Thuringia